Danuta Perka (née Wołosz; born 22 June 1956) is a Polish female former track and field hurdler who specialised in the 100 metres hurdles. She was a two-time national champion in the 60 metres hurdles, taking the Polish title in 1977 and 1983.

From Korsze, she was a highly ranked athlete during her career, placing within the season's top ten hurdlers on time between 1977 and 1981. Her personal best of 12.65 seconds came in Mexico City in 1979. She was a member of Gwardia Warsaw during her career. Perka changed her competitive name after marrying fellow athlete Wlodzimierz Perka.

Perka competed at a time when Polish athletes were prominent in hurdling; she took the 60 metres hurdles gold medal at the 1979 European Athletics Indoor Championships ahead of compatriot and former champion Grażyna Rabsztyn, while at the 1979 Summer Universiade she was runner-up to fellow Pole Lucyna Langer in the 100 m hurdles. As of 2017, her time of 12.66 remains the fastest ever non-winning time at the competition and the fourth fastest of any finalist, after Langer, Monique Éwanjé-Épée and Vashti Thomas. She was the B Final winner of the hurdles at the 1981 European Cup.

International competitions

National titles
Polish Indoor Athletics Championships
60 m hurdles: 1977, 1983

See also
List of European Athletics Indoor Championships medalists (women)

References

External links

Living people
1956 births
People from Kętrzyn County
Polish female hurdlers
Universiade silver medalists for Poland
Universiade medalists in athletics (track and field)
Medalists at the 1979 Summer Universiade